Matt Nickell (born July 11, 1983 in Waukee, Iowa) is an American soccer player, who last played forward for D.C. United in Major League Soccer.

Career
Nickell played college for Drake University Soccer from 2001 to 2004.  In his four seasons there he accumulated 31 goals and 22 assists.  In 2003, his junior year, he set the Drake single-season record for goals with 13.

He was selected in the first round 12th overall in the 2005 MLS Supplemental Draft by the D.C. United.  Following the 2006 season, he was waived by the team.

References

External links
 

1983 births
Living people
American soccer players
D.C. United players
Drake Bulldogs men's soccer players
People from Waukee, Iowa
Major League Soccer players
Des Moines Menace players
USL League Two players
D.C. United draft picks
Soccer players from Iowa
Association football forwards